O Quatrilho is a 1995 Brazilian drama film directed by Fábio Barreto. It was adapted from a José Clemente Pozenato novel by telenovela writer Antônio Calmon and screenwriter Leopoldo Serran. It stars famous telenovela actresses Patrícia Pillar and Glória Pires and Bruno Campos, who later found fame for his role as Quentin Costa on Nip/Tuck. The original soundtrack was composed by classical musician Jaques Morelenbaum and the theme song by pop singer-songwriter Caetano Veloso. It was the first Brazilian film nominated for the Academy Award for Best Foreign Language Film in more than 30 years, after 1962's O Pagador de Promessas.

Plot
The film follows the story of two Italian immigrant couples living in the state of Rio Grande do Sul in the early 20th century; Teresa (Patrícia Pillar) and Angelo (Alexandre Paternost) and Pierina (Glória Pires) and Massimo (Bruno Campos). While the couples struggle for survival in their new country, an unexpected love between Massimo and Teresa emerges. They fight against family and cultural traditions and head to a new destiny, leaving their partners behind. Quatrilho is the name of a card game in which the player has to betray his partner to win. It is also a reference to the Portuguese language word quatro, which means four. The film was also advertised as O Qu4trilho.

Cast
Patrícia Pillar as Teresa
Glória Pires as Pierina
Bruno Campos as Massimo
Alexandre Paternost as Angelo
Cecil Thiré as Father Gentile
José Lewgoy as Rocco
Fábio Barreto as Gaudério
José Clemente Pozenato as the photographer

Awards and nominations
Beside its Academy Award nomination, the film won three awards at the Havana Film Festival: Best Actress for Glória Pires, Best Art Direction and Best Music. Pires also won the São Paulo Association of Art Critics trophy for Best Actress for her performance in the film.

See also
 List of submissions to the 68th Academy Awards for Best Foreign Language Film
 List of Brazilian submissions for the Academy Award for Best Foreign Language Film

References

External links
 
 O Quatrilho at Adoro Cinema (portuguese)

1995 films
1990s Portuguese-language films
1990s Italian-language films
Films directed by Fábio Barreto
1995 romantic drama films
Brazilian romantic drama films
Adultery in films
Films set in the 1910s
Paramount Pictures films